The 1902–03 Princeton Tigers men's ice hockey season was the 4th season of play for the program.

Season
Towards the end of their season the Tigers played their first game outside of the United States when they traveled to play Queen's University. However, shortly after the game the Faculty Athletic Committee ordered that the team be disbanded. This caused Princeton to forfeit the tie against Columbia, which was to be played off after the game against Queens, and finish in a 3-way tie for second.

Roster

Standings

Schedule and Results

|-
!colspan=12 style=";" | Regular Season

† Because Princeton's team was disbanded they were forced to forfeit the overtime session to be played after the 18th of February.

References

Princeton Tigers men's ice hockey seasons
Princeton
Princeton
Princeton
Princeton